Radu Albot was the defending champion but decided to participate at the 2014 Košice Open instead.

Blaž Kavčič won the title, defeating Alexander Kudryavtsev in the final, 6–4, 7–6(10–8).

Seeds

  Blaž Kavčič (champion)
  Alexander Kudryavtsev (final)
  Nikoloz Basilashvili (second round)
  Denys Molchanov (semifinals)
  Valery Rudnev (quarterfinals)
  Egor Gerasimov (semifinals)
  Shuichi Sekiguchi (quarterfinals)
  Alexander Lobkov (quarterfinals)

Draw

Finals

Top half

Bottom half

References
 Main Draw
 Qualifying Draw

Fergana Challenger - Men's Singles
2014 Men's Singles